Major General Sir Allan Henry Shafto Adair, 6th Baronet,  (3 November 1897 – 4 August 1988) was a senior officer of the British Army who served in both World wars; as a company commander in the Grenadier Guards in the First World War, and as General Officer Commanding of the Guards Armoured Division in the Second World War.

Early life
Adair was born in London, the only son of Sir Robert Shafto Adair, 5th Baronet, and Mary Bosanquet. He attended Harrow School between 1912 and 1916.

Military career

First World War
Adair fought in the First World War. He joined the British Army, receiving his commission as a probationary second lieutenant on 2 May 1916 in the 5th (Reserve) Battalion of the Grenadier Guards. From January 1917 onwards he served in the trenches of the Western Front in France and Belgium as part of the 2nd Company, 3rd Battalion, Grenadier Guards, with the rank of lieutenant. The battalion was part of the 2nd Guards Brigade of the Guards Division. Adair's first major battle was in the pursuit of the retreating German Army to the Hindenburg Line. The division then took part in the Battle of Passchendaele. Adair, however, took no part in the battle, due to an injury sustained in a bicycle accident in early July 1917. He returned to the battalion in January 1918.

Adair was awarded his first Military Cross (MC) on 2 December 1918. The citation read: 

With the acting rank of captain, Adair was Officer Commanding 2 Company from 22 September to 11 November 1918, receiving his second MC after the war on 2 April 1919 "for conspicuous gallantry and skill at Preux-au-Sart, on 4 November 1918. In command of the left front company, which was held up by an organised line of machine guns, he so manoeuvred his platoons as to capture the line with a minimum of casualties. Although wounded in the leg, he continued in command until relieved the following day".

Interbellum
After the armistice of 11 November 1918 Adair's battalion returned to London, where on 29 June 1920 he received his permanent lieutenant's commission, with seniority backdated to 2 August 1918. On 29 September 1923 he was promoted to captain in the 2nd Battalion. He was promoted to major on 22 May 1932, and returned to the 3rd Battalion to serve as second-in-command until 11 April 1940, seven months after the Second World War broke out.

Second World War
After a short time as Chief Instructor at 161 Infantry Officer Cadet Training Unit at Sandhurst, he returned to his regiment on 8 May 1940 where he was appointed Commanding Officer of the 3rd Battalion with the rank of acting lieutenant colonel. The battalion, forming part of the 1st Guards Brigade of the 1st Infantry Division (the former commanded by Brigadier Merton Beckwith-Smith and the latter by Major General Harold Alexander, both, like Adair, Guardsmen), soon found themselves in the thick of the fighting during the battles of Belgium and France, and held the perimeter against German attacks during the Dunkirk evacuation. Lance Corporal Harry Nicholls from Adair's battalion was awarded one of the first Victoria Crosses of the war.

Adair was promoted to lieutenant colonel on 19 September 1940, and on 17 October 1940 was appointed Commander of the 30th Independent Infantry Brigade (Guards), re-designated the 6th Guards Armoured Brigade on 15 September 1941, with the rank of temporary brigadier.

From 12 September 1942 until December 1945 Adair was General Officer Commanding (GOC) of the Guards Armoured Division, taking over from Oliver Leese, receiving promotion to colonel on 30 June 1943, while serving as an acting and then temporary major general from 21 September 1942. After training the division throughout the United Kingdom for 21 months, the Guards Armoured Division arrived in Normandy as part of Operation Overlord on 28 June 1944 as part of Lieutenant General Sir Richard O'Connor's VIII Corps, first seeing action during Operation Goodwood in July, and then in Operation Bluecoat in July/August. Following the Allied break-out from Normandy they advanced across Northern France and into Belgium as part of Lieutenant General Sir Brian Horrocks' XXX Corps. The division then took a leading role in the ground advance in Operation Market Garden in September. Held in reserve during the Battle of the Bulge in December, it was committed to the Battle of the Reichswald (Operation Veritable) in February and March 1945. After advancing through Germany and the German surrender in May 1945 the Guards Armoured Division remained as part of the occupying forces, but on 12 June 1945 was converted into an infantry formation, the Guards Division.

From December 1945, three months after the surrender of Japan, until November 1946 Adair served as GOC of the Greek 13th Infantry Division, during the Civil War, and receiving promotion to major general on 25 July 1946, with seniority from 12 November 1944. He finally retired from active service on 11 March 1947, but remained in the Regular Army Reserve of Officers until reaching the mandatory retirement age on 3 November 1957, his 60th birthday.

Later life

Adair was appointed Exon in the Yeomen of the Guard, the ceremonial bodyguards to the monarch, on 21 November 1947, receiving promotion to Ensign on 30 June 1950 and then to Lieutenant on 31 August 1951, before finally retiring on 14 November 1967.

He served as a Governor of Harrow School from 1947 until 1952, was Colonel of the Grenadier Guards from 1961 to 1974, and a Deputy Grand Master of the United Grand Lodge of Freemasons from 1969 to 1976.

He also served as Deputy Lieutenant for County Antrim, and as a Justice of the Peace for the county of Suffolk.

Personal life
On 28 April 1919 Adair married Enid Violet Ida Ward (1897–1984). They had two sons; Lieutenant Desmond Allan Shafto Adair (1920–1943), killed in action in Italy, and Robert Dudley Shafto Adair (1923–1925), and three daughters; Bridget Mary Adair (b. 1928), Juliet Enid Adair (b. 1930) and Annabel Violet Adair (b. 1937).

Adair succeeded his father as 6th Baronet on 9 October 1949 inheriting the family home of Flixton Hall in Suffolk. However the burden of its upkeep and maintenance, combined with heavy death duties meant that he was obliged to sell the property in 1950. In his 1986 memoir, Adair described Flixton Hall as "a vast, uncomfortable mausoleum, with no proper central heating. In winter the children had to wear their overcoats when moving from room to room". It was demolished within two years. Adair then settled in the village of Raveningham, Norfolk.

Adair died on 4 August 1988 at the age of 90. With no surviving sons his title became extinct.

Publications

Bibliography
Irish Generals in the Second World War, Richard Doherty

References

External links
 
 
British Army Officers 1939–1945
Generals of World War II

|-

|-

|-

|-

1897 births
1988 deaths
Academics of the Royal Military College, Sandhurst
Baronets in the Baronetage of the United Kingdom
British Army generals of World War II
British Army personnel of World War I
Companions of the Distinguished Service Order
Companions of the Order of the Bath
Deputy Lieutenants of Antrim
Freemasons of the United Grand Lodge of England
Grenadier Guards officers
Knights Grand Cross of the Royal Victorian Order
People educated at Harrow School
Military personnel from London
Recipients of the Croix de Guerre 1939–1945 (France)
Recipients of the Military Cross
British Army major generals